Vladimir Sergeyvich Ivlev (born 28 February 1990) is a Russian professional basketball player for BC Samara of the VTB United League. He also represents the senior Russian national team.

Professional career
After playing junior level basketball with the youth teams of Dynamo Moscow, Ivlev played with the reserve team of Dynamo Moscow (Dynamo Moscow 2), during the 2007–08 season. In the 2009–10 season, he made his debut with the senior men's team of Dynamo Moscow. In 2011, he joined BC Ryazan, and in 2012, he moved to Nizhny Novgorod. In 2016, he moved to Lokomotiv Kuban, where he spent four seasons, before moving to Parma Basket Perm for the 2020–21 season. On 13 July 2021 he signed with team CSKA Moscow, which competed in the EuroLeague until it was suspended due to the 2022 Russian invasion of Ukraine.

Russian national team
Ivlev was a member of the Russian junior national teams. With Russia's junior national teams, he played at the 2007 FIBA Europe Under-18 Championship, the 2009 FIBA Europe Under-20 Championship, and the 2010 FIBA Europe Under-20 Championship.

He has also been a member of the senior Russian national basketball team. With Russia's senior team, he played at the EuroBasket 2017.

References

External links
Euroleague.net profile
FIBA Archive profile
FIBA Europe profile
Eurobasket.com profile

1990 births
Living people
BC Dynamo Moscow players
BC Nizhny Novgorod players
Centers (basketball)
PBC Lokomotiv-Kuban players
Power forwards (basketball)
Russian men's basketball players
Basketball players from Moscow
Universiade gold medalists for Russia
Universiade medalists in basketball
2019 FIBA Basketball World Cup players
Medalists at the 2013 Summer Universiade